Marko Gustavo Ciurlizza Rodríguez (born February 22, 1978 in Lima) is a Peruvian retired footballer who played as a defensive midfielder.

Club career
Marko Ciurlizza started his career playing in soccer at the club Universitario de Deportes. Later he left Universitario and in 2002 joined Alianza Lima. He also had spells with Sport Boys and Cobresol.

International career
Ciurlizza has made 34 appearances for the Peru national football team. He also went to Copa America 2004 part of the squad of Peru. Selected for the 1997 Copa América, he did not play and debuted in the national team on June 29, 1999 at the 1999 Copa América match against Japan.

References

External links

1978 births
Living people
Footballers from Lima
Association football midfielders
Peruvian footballers
Peruvian expatriate footballers
Peru international footballers
1997 Copa América players
1999 Copa América players
2000 CONCACAF Gold Cup players
2004 Copa América players
Club Universitario de Deportes footballers
Club Alianza Lima footballers
Botafogo de Futebol e Regatas players
Sport Boys footballers
Cobresol FBC footballers
Peruvian Primera División players
Expatriate footballers in Brazil
Peruvian expatriate sportspeople in Brazil